Green Worker Cooperatives (GWC) is a non-profit organization that incubates environmentally sustainable worker cooperatives in the South Bronx of New York City. The organization, founded in 2003 by Omar Freilla, seeks to create green-collar jobs and promotes environmental justice through the creation of cooperatives. GWC is a member of the United States Federation of Worker Cooperatives.

In 2008, Green Worker Cooperatives started ReBuilders Source, a worker cooperative that reuses discarded building materials. Founder Freilla received the Rockefeller Foundation’s Jane Jacobs Medal and $100,000 which he used to finance the organization. Rebuilders Source also received a $70,000 grant from Citgo.

References

External links
 Official Website

Organizations established in 2003
Non-profit organizations based in the Bronx
Cooperatives in the United States